Yamashiro is a Japanese word with kanji often meaning mountain castle (山城).  There are however other kanji spellings.

 Yamashiro, Kyoto, former town in Japan
 Yamashiro, Tokushima, former town in Japan
 Yamashiro Province, former Japanese province
 Japanese battleship Yamashiro, a battleship of the Imperial Japanese Navy
 Yamashiro Onsen, an onsen in Kaga, Ishikawa province
 Yamashiro Park Taiyogaoka Stadium, an athletic stadium in Uji, Kyoto, Japan
 Yamashiro Historic District, a villa, restaurant, and gardens in Los Angeles, California
 Yamashiro, or yamajiro, category of Japanese castle in which the main structures are located on a mountain
In addition to kanji variation, the word could also be read as Yamagusuku in the Ryukyu Islands.

People
Yamashiro is also a Japanese surname. In the Okinawan language, the kanji is read Yamagusuku. Notable people with the surname include:
Prince Yamashiro (d.643)
 Danny Yamashiro (1967- )
 Hiroshi Yamashiro (1958- )
 Junya Yamashiro (1985- )
 Rafael Yamashiro (1963- )
 Shingo Yamashiro (1938–2009)
 Shoji Yamashiro, pseudonym for Tsutomu Ōhashi
 Stephen K. Yamashiro (1941–2011)
 Mary Yamashiro Otani (1923–2005)
 Augusto Miyashiro Yamashiro (1949- )

Fictional characters
 Aoba Yamashiro
 Tatsu Yamashiro

See also
 Shiroyama (disambiguation)
 Shancheng (disambiguation), Chinese placenames that is written with the same Chinese/Japanese characters as, and has a similar meaning to, the Japanese Yamashiro

Japanese-language surnames
Okinawan surnames